Shoaymit-e Mandil (also Romanized as Sho‘aymīţ-e Mandīl, Sho‘eymet-e Mandīl, and Sho‘eymīţ-e Mandīl; also known as Shāmeyāt, Shāmīāt, Sho‘ameyţ-e Qarah, and Sho‘ameyţ-e Qarah-ye Seh) is a village in Mosharrahat Rural District, in the Central District of Ahvaz County, Khuzestan Province, Iran. At the 2006 census, its population was 30, in 7 families.

References 

Populated places in Ahvaz County